The Baltic Review is an English-language newspaper covering general business news in the Baltic states. It also has a German-language edition Baltische Rundschau. Newspaper's offices are located in Riga, Tallinn and Rhens with headquarters in Lithuanian capital city Vilnius. The Baltic Review describes itself as "the independent newspaper from the Baltics - for the World." The newspaper is owned by Ingvar Henry Lotts (Also, spelled Ingwar Heinrich Lotz or Ingvar Heinrich Lotc).

References

External links
 Newspaper web in English Baltic Review
 Newspaper web in German Baltische Rundschau
 Newspaper web in Russian Балтийское обозрение

Newspapers published in Lithuania
Business newspapers
Business in Europe